Richard Francis Emile Tardy (born 29 July 1950) is a French former professional football player and manager. He led several clubs and national teams as a coach.

Career
Tardy has managed in the Superleague Greece with Aris Thessaloniki F.C., and he led the Lebanon national football team before managing Africa Sports in Côte d'Ivoire. He managed OC Khouribga during the 2008–09 GNF 1 season.

Tardy coached the Rwanda national under-17 football team to a second-place finish at the 2011 African U-17 Championship, before leading the team at the 2011 FIFA U-17 World Cup finals.

References

External links
 

1950 births
Living people
Sportspeople from Bouches-du-Rhône
French footballers
Association football forwards
Pays d'Aix FC players
French football managers
Aris Thessaloniki F.C. managers
Lebanon national football team managers
Africa Sports d'Abidjan managers
Al Wahda FC managers
Olympic Club de Safi managers
Al-Wakrah SC managers
Olympique Club de Khouribga managers
AS Saint-Étienne managers
Al Ansar FC managers
Young Lions FC head coaches
Super League Greece managers
Lebanese Premier League managers
Singapore Premier League head coaches
French expatriate football managers
French expatriate sportspeople in Greece
French expatriate sportspeople in Lebanon
French expatriate sportspeople in Ivory Coast
French expatriate sportspeople in Algeria
French expatriate sportspeople in the United Arab Emirates
French expatriate sportspeople in Morocco
French expatriate sportspeople in Qatar
French expatriate sportspeople in Rwanda
French expatriate sportspeople in Singapore
Expatriate football managers in Greece
Expatriate football managers in Lebanon
Expatriate football managers in Ivory Coast
Expatriate football managers in Algeria
Expatriate football managers in the United Arab Emirates
Expatriate football managers in Morocco
Expatriate football managers in Qatar
Expatriate football managers in Rwanda
Expatriate football managers in Singapore
Footballers from Provence-Alpes-Côte d'Azur